Hateful may refer to:

Hateful Run, a stream in West Virginia, US
"Hateful", a song by The Clash from London Calling, 1979

See also
Hate (disambiguation)